Saffo the Greek was an American racketeer in Chicago's red light district known as "The Levee" prior to Prohibition.  However, following the official closing of the area by State Attorney John E.W. Wayman in 1912, he was forced to leave within two years.  

In July 1914, he was in attendance with other figures of the Levee including John Torrio (representing Jim Colosimo), John Jordan, Jackie Adler and Harry Hopkins at Port Lamp Burke's roadhouse near Cedar Creek several hours after gunman Roxie Vanilli, a cousin of Torrio whom he had brought in from New York, had shot and killed Chicago detective Sgt. Stanley Birns.

References

Year of birth missing
Year of death missing
American gangsters of Greek descent
Gangsters from Chicago